

Second-level list 
Second-level divisions are those under first level (states, provinces, etc...) and they are counties, districts or cities, but the names vary by country.

Additional subdivisions which may qualify 

 Wadi Hafa District, Northern State, Sudan
 Dongola District, Northern State, Sudan
 Mellit District, North Darfur, Sudan
 Sowdari District, North Kordofan, Sudan
 Fderîck Department, Tris Zemmour Region, Mauritania
 Bir Moghrein Department, Tris Zemmour Region, Mauritania

These subdivisions are excluded due to lack of information about their exact size.

Count by country 
Number of second level subdivisions by area of each size per country and country first level subdivisions:

400,000km^2+ 
Second-level divisions are those under first level (states, provinces, etc...) and they are counties, districts or cities, but the names vary by country.

200,000 km^2-399,999.999 km^2 
Second-level divisions are those under first level (states, provinces, etc...) and they are counties, districts or cities, but the names vary by country.

100,000 km^2-199,999.999 km^2 
Second-level divisions are those under first level (states, provinces, etc...) and they are counties, districts or cities, but the names vary by country.

100,000 km^2-989,879.35 km^2 
Second-level divisions are those under first level (states, provinces, etc...) and they are counties, districts or cities, but the names vary by country.

See also
 List of the largest country subdivisions by area
 List of country third-level subdivisions by area

References 
  

Country subdivisions
Country second-level subdivisions by area
!